Sarabhai is a small, circular, bowl-shaped crater on the Mare Serenitatis, in the northeast quadrant of the Moon. The formation is relatively isolated, being located to the northeast of the crater Bessel. It lies along a wrinkle ridge designated the Dorsum Azara.

This crater is named after Indian astrophysicist Vikram Sarabhai, considered the Father of the Indian Space Programme. It was previously identified as Bessel A.

References

External links

 LTO-42B4 Sarabhai — L&PI topographic map

Impact craters on the Moon
Mare Serenitatis